Jessica S. Tisch (born February 1, 1981) is the current Commissioner of the New York City Department of Sanitation. She has also served as Commissioner of the New York City Department of Information Technology and Telecommunications and Deputy Commissioner for Information Technology of the New York Police Department.

Education and personal life 
Tisch was born to James S. Tisch, Chief Executive Officer of Loews Co. She earned an undergraduate degree from Harvard University and completed an M.B.A and J.D. there in 2008. 

In 2006, she married Daniel Zachary Levine in a ceremony that was officiated by her maternal grandfather, Rabbi Philip Hiat, at the Central Synagogue in Manhattan. Tisch has two sons.

Career

New York Police Department 
In 2008, Tisch began her career with the NYPD and went on to hold several civilian positions within the agency. In February 2014, she was appointed Deputy Commissioner, Information Technology for the NYPD.

New York Department of Information Technology and Telecommunications 
In November 2019, Tisch was appointed Commissioner for NYC Department of Information Technology and Telecommunication by Mayor de Blasio.

New York Department of Sanitation 
On April 18, 2022, Tisch was appointed by Mayor Eric Adams as the Commissioner of the New York City Department of Sanitation.

References

1981 births
Living people
Harvard Business School alumni
Harvard College alumni
Harvard Law School alumni
Place of birth missing (living people)